Krasyliv is a city in Khmelnytskyi Raion, Khmelnytskyi Oblast (province) of western Ukraine. It hosts the administration of Krasyliv urban hromada, one of the hromadas of Ukraine. Population: 

Until 18 July 2020, Krasyliv was the administrative center of Krasyliv Raion. The raion was abolished in July 2020 as part of the administrative reform of Ukraine, which reduced the number of raions of Khmelnytskyi Oblast to three. The area of Krasyliv Raion was merged into Khmelnytskyi Raion.

Gallery

References

Cities in Khmelnytskyi Oblast
Volhynian Governorate
Cities of district significance in Ukraine